Ro-115 may refer to:

 , an Imperial Japanese Navy submarine commissioned in 1943 and sunk in 1945
 RO-115 Mark I, an Egyptian version of the T-62 tank